South Imenti is an electoral constituency in Kenya. It is one of nine constituencies of Meru County. It has eight wards, all of which elect councillors for the Meru Central County Council. The constituency was established for the 1988 elections.

South Imenti was one of three constituencies of the former Meru Central District.

Members of Parliament

Wards

References 

Constituencies in Eastern Province (Kenya)
1988 establishments in Kenya
Constituencies established in 1988
Constituencies in Meru County